A by-election was held for the New South Wales Legislative Assembly electorate of Cowra on 2 April 1896 because of the death of Denis Donnelly.

Dates

Result

				

The by-election was caused by the death of Denis Donnelly.

See also
Electoral results for the district of Cowra
List of New South Wales state by-elections

References

1896 elections in Australia
New South Wales state by-elections
1890s in New South Wales